United Nations Security Council resolution 720, adopted unanimously at a closed meeting on 21 November 1991, having considered the question of the recommendation for the appointment of the Secretary-General of the United Nations, the Council recommended to the General Assembly that Mr. Boutros Boutros-Ghali be appointed for a term of office from 1 January 1992, to 31 December 1996.

On 3 December 1991, the General Assembly endorsed the Security Council's decision, and appointed Boutros-Ghali under Resolution 46/21.

See also
 List of United Nations Security Council Resolutions 701 to 800 (1991–1993)

References

External links
 
Text of the Resolution at undocs.org

 0720
 0720
November 1991 events